The Great London Mystery is a 1920 British silent crime film directed by Charles Raymond and starring David Devant, Robert Clifton and Charles Raymond. It was a 12-chapter serial showcasing the acting abilities of one of the most famous magicians of his time, David Devant (1868-1941), allowing him to present his routine on film. After years of doing sleight of hand stage shows, Devant later turned to acting and film distribution. The film was co-written by Charles Raymond and Hope Loring. It is considered a lost film today.

Plot
An illusionist called The Master Magician tries to obstruct the evil plans of an Asian villain named Ching Ling Fu who has supernatural powers. Also in the film, an Englishman robs a sacred jewel from a temple and is haunted by its curse. The film couldn't have been too serious since one of the characters was named "Froggie the Vampire".

Cast
 David Devant ...  The Master Magician 
 Robert Clifton ...  Bob Sefton 
 Charles Raymond ...  Ching Fu 
 Lady Doris Stapleton ...  Audrey Malvern 
 Kenneth Duffy ...  Edward Selwyn 
 Martin Valmour ...  Webb 
 Lester Gard ...  The Man Monkey 
 Sadie Bennett ...  Curley 
 Lola De Liane ...  Froggie the vampire

References

External links

1920 films
1920 crime films
Films directed by Charles Raymond
British silent films
British black-and-white films
British crime films
Lost British films
1920 lost films
Lost crime films
1920s English-language films
1920s British films